Tadej Trdina (born 25 January 1988) is a Slovenian footballer who plays for NK Fužinar as a forward.

External links

1988 births
Living people
Sportspeople from Slovenj Gradec
Slovenian footballers
Slovenian expatriate footballers
Association football forwards
SV Grödig players
Wolfsberger AC players
NK Aluminij players
Slovenian PrvaLiga players
Slovenian Second League players
Austrian Football Bundesliga players
2. Liga (Austria) players
Austrian Regionalliga players
Expatriate footballers in Austria
Slovenian expatriate sportspeople in Austria